Wes McKinney is an American software developer and businessman. He is the creator and "Benevolent Dictator for Life" (BDFL) of the open-source pandas package for data analysis in the Python programming language, and has also authored three versions of the reference book Python for Data Analysis. He was the CEO and founder of technology startup Datapad. He was a software engineer at Two Sigma Investments. He founded Ursa Labs.

Early life and education 
McKinney graduated from MIT with a B.S. in Mathematics in 2007. In 2010, he began a Ph.D program in Statistics at Duke University, but went on leave in 2011.

Career 
From 2007 to 2010, McKinney researched global macro and credit trading strategies at AQR Capital Management. During his time at AQR Capital, he learned Python and started building what would become pandas.  McKinney made the pandas project public in 2009.

McKinney left AQR in 2010 to start a PhD in Statistics at Duke University.  He went on leave from Duke in the summer of 2011 to devote more time to developing Pandas, culminating in the writing of Python for Data Analysis in 2012.

In 2012 he co-founded Lambda Foundry Inc.

McKinney co-founded Datapad with Cheng She in January 2013, with McKinney as CEO.  Datapad developed a data visualization product also on the Python stack targeting enterprise customers. Datapad was acquired by Cloudera in September 2014. McKinney joined the engineering team at Cloudera following the acquisition. He worked on an open-source project called Ibis, incubated within Cloudera Labs, aiming at using Python for big data problems. In 2016, McKinney joined the investment fund Two Sigma Investments to work on Apache Arrow. In 2018, he launched Ursa Labs.

Media coverage 
McKinney has been interviewed by VentureBeat and others. He frequently gives talks to the Python community.

References

External links
 Personal website
 Book discussion on YCombinator
 Ibis project blog

Massachusetts Institute of Technology School of Science alumni
Living people
Year of birth missing (living people)
Place of birth missing (living people)
American statisticians
Python (programming language) people
American computer programmers
Free software programmers
Data scientists
American chief executives